Katrine da Silva Costa (born 19 April 1998), simply known as Katrine, is a Brazilian professional footballer who plays as a midfielder for Série A1 club SE Palmeiras and the Brazil women's national team.

Club career
Katrine has played for SC Corinthians Paulista, Grêmio Osasco Audax EC, SC Internacional, Grêmio FBPA, Minas Brasília FF and Palmeiras in Brazil.

International career
Katrine represented Brazil at two FIFA U-20 Women's World Cup editions (2016 and 2018). She made her senior debut on 17 September 2021.

References

External links
 

1998 births
Living people
Sportspeople from Fortaleza
Brazilian women's footballers
Women's association football midfielders
Sport Club Corinthians Paulista (women) players
Grêmio Osasco Audax Esporte Clube players
Sport Club Internacional (women) players
Grêmio Foot-Ball Porto Alegrense (women) players
Sociedade Esportiva Palmeiras (women) players
Campeonato Brasileiro de Futebol Feminino Série A1 players
Brazil women's international footballers